Antero Lähde (born 13 December 1964) is a Finnish biathlete. He competed in the sprint event at the 1988 Winter Olympics.

References

External links
 

1964 births
Living people
Finnish male biathletes
Olympic biathletes of Finland
Biathletes at the 1988 Winter Olympics
Sportspeople from Satakunta